The Sons of Great Bear (literally, The Sons of the Great She-Bear) is a 1966 East German Western film, directed by the Czechoslovak filmmaker Josef Mach and starring the Yugoslav actor Gojko Mitić in the leading role of Tokei-ihto. The script was adapted from the eponymous series of novels by author Liselotte Welskopf-Henrich, and the music composed by Wilhelm Neef. The picture is a revisionist Western, pioneering the genre of the Ostern, and emphasises the positive portrayal of Native Americans, while presenting the Whites as antagonists. It is one of the most successful pictures produced by the DEFA film studio.

Plot
In 1874, the U.S. government encroaches on the lands of the Lakota people. Mattotaupa, an Oglala Lakota man, gambles with Red Fox, a White criminal, in a saloon. When seeing he has gold, Red Fox demands to know its origin. Mattotaupa refuses, and Red Fox murders him. Mattotaupa's son, the young and fierce warrior Tokei-ihto who distrusts the Whites and never drinks their "Firewater", witnesses the murder.

Two years later, Tokei-ihto is the war chieftain of the Oglala's Bear Band and one of Crazy Horse's commanders in the Great Sioux War. He raids a resupply column sent to a U.S. Army fort, but brings the commander's daughter Katie Smith to her father unharmed, requesting to negotiate peace. Major Smith turns him down, and one of his officers tries to shoot the chieftain, who then surprises the soldiers and single-handedly destroys their munitions depot.

The warriors return to their camp victorious. Red Fox arrives, offering a peace treaty. Tokei-ihto is sent to negotiate. Smith demands they settle in a reservation. When Tokei-ihto rejects the offer, he is imprisoned. The Bear Band are brutally forced to resettle.

After several months, the war has ended. Red Fox enters Tokei-ihto's cell, trying to force him to reveal the location of the gold mine. Katie Smith and her friend Adams stop him before he begins to torture the captive. They recommend that after being released, he should take his people to Canada. The chieftain accepts the government's terms and returns to the reservation.

Tokei-ihto ventures to the sacred caves of the Great She-Bear, the Band's Totem animal, which are also the gold's source, to seek the blessing of the spirits to their departure. Red Fox's henchman Pitt goes after him, hoping to find gold. He stumbles upon a she-bear which kills him, though not before he fatally wounds her with a gunshot. Tokei-ihto finds the she-bear's cub. He takes it back to the tribe.

The Bear Band leave. They raid an army column, and General George Crook offers a $200 reward on the chieftain's head. Red Fox, still seeking the gold, sets after them with a large group of ruffians. They gain on the Lakota as they cross the Missouri River. Red Fox agrees to let the people move on undisturbed if Tokei-ihto would remain behind. The chieftain agrees. After a prolonged fight, he manages to kill Red Fox. The band settle on the other bank, finding refuge.

Cast
 Gojko Mitić as Tokei-ihto (voiced by Karl Sturm)
 Jiří Vršťala as Jim Fred 'Red Fox' Clark (voiced by Fred Düren)
 Hans Finohr as Hawandschita
 Günter Schubert as Feldger
 Hannjo Hasse as Pitt
 Horst Kube as Thomas
 Henry Hübchen as Hapedah
 Adolf Peter Hoffmann as Mattotaupa
 Sepp Klose as Tȟašúŋke Witkó
 Franz Bonnet as Crazy Horse the elder
 Kati Székely as Uinonah (Winúŋna)
 Rolf Römer as Tobias
 Hans Hardt-Hardtloff as Major Samuel Smith
 Gerhard Rachold as Lieutenant Roach
 Horst Jonischkan as Adams
 Jozef Adamovič as Chapa (voiced by Klaus Bergatt)
 Blanche Kommerell as Eenah
 Milan Jablonský as Mountain Thunder (voiced by Lothar Schellhorn) 
 Helmut Schreiber as Ben
 Rolf Ripperger as Joe
 Brigitte Krause as Jenny
 Karin Beewen as Cate Smith
 Ruth Kommerell as Tashina
 Zofia Słaboszowska as Mongshongsha (voiced by Ursula Mundt)
 Slobodanka Marković as Sitopanaki (voiced by Gertrud Adam) 
 Jozef Majerčík as Chetansapa (voiced by Ezard Haußmann)
 Martin Ťapák as Shonka (voiced by Horst Manz)
 Walter E. Fuß as Theo
 Jozo Lepetić as Bill (voiced by Horst Schön)
 Herbert Dirmoser as Old Crow
 Willi Schrade as Tatokano
 Dietmar Richter-Reinick as Lieutenant Warner

Production

Background
The Western genre had never enjoyed the approval of the political establishment in the German Democratic Republic: the novels of Karl May, the most prominent German-language author associated with the topic, were not allowed to be re-published in the country until 1982.

East Germany had its own writers who dealt with the subject, though. The Munich-born Liselotte Welskopf-Henrich composed a first draft of a novel set in the land of the Sioux in 1918, when she was 17 years old. After the end of the Second World War, Henrich joined the Communist Party of Germany and settled in East Berlin, where she held a tenure as a Classics professor at the Humboldt University of Berlin. She finished her book in 1951. The following year, it was published under the title The Sons of Great Bear, gaining wide success among children and youth. It became the basis for an eponymous hexalogy of novels about the adventures of Harka, an Oglala Lakota who would eventually be given the name Tokei-ihto. Henrich's books were written from the Native American perspective, and she studied Lakota culture extensively to convey an authentic depiction of them, and even conducted several tours to the United States and Canada to live among their tribes. Her books were translated into 18 languages and sold 7.5 million copies worldwide.

Inception
The attitude of the DEFA studiothe country's state-owned cinema monopoly  to Westerns changed in the early 1960s, with the release of a wave of Karl May films produced in West Germany, especially the series directed by Harald Reinl which began with Apache Gold in 1963. While not distributed in the GDR, East German tourists could view them when vacationing in the neighboring Czechoslovakia. The extensive popularity of those pictures convinced DEFA officials to make their own version. Producer Hans Mahlichone of the veteran members of the studio who participated in the making of some of DEFA's most widely known pictures, like Castles and Cottages and The Sailor's Songwas the first to promote the idea, arguing that such films would become a great commercial success. While seeking to exploit the popularity of the subject, the studio directors had to consider the ideological demands of the establishment, which would have viewed a typical Western as a reactionary and a "bourgeoisie" form of art – indeed, Der Spiegel reported that several years earlier, an attempt to turn Henrich's novels into a film was "vetoed by the party, which negatively deemed the Westerns as a capitalistic  influence that would encourage criminality." Therefore, they sought to imbue the planned picture with themes which would suit state officials and turn it into "politically correct entertainment": Henrich's novels, with their emphasis on the negative portrayal of the white colonists and their already established popularity with the audience, were selected to be adapted to the screen. Studio dramaturgue Günter Karl wrote: "We knew we had to set ourselves apart from the capitalist movies of the genre... But we were nevertheless forced to use at least part of the elements that make this genre so effective." Lieselotte Welskopf-Henrich told an interviewer that "in their themes, the West German Karl May films lag far behind good American pictures in which the Native American and his right to self-defense were already recognized. We attempted to make a new sort of an 'Indian film'."

Development
While the studio accepted the idea of making a Western, most of its filmmakers regarded it with skepticism, and did not believe it would garner success. When Mahlich sought a director for his upcoming production, no East German agreed to participate, as none was ready to risk his reputation. He had to enlist the Czechoslovak director Josef Mach, and his fellow countryman Jaroslav Tuzar as cinematographer. In a trait that would characterize all of DEFA's Westerns, while The Sons of Great Bear was an East German work, the production team was multinational, with citizens of several other Eastern Bloc countries. In early 1965, Mahlich traveled to the Socialist Federal Republic of Yugoslavia in order to arrange filming locations and to seek actors. Shortly before leaving back to the GDR, he stumbled upon a film publicity photograph which featured Gojko Mitić. Mitić, a student of the Sport and Physical Education Faculty in the University of Belgrade, worked as a stuntman and an extra in several Westerns produced in his country, beginning with the 1963 Old Shatterhand. He was finally given a minor role of his own in Among Vultures. Mahlich immediately resolved to have him star in the role of Tokei-ihto. As Mitić did not master German, he was dubbed by Karl Sturm. GDR-based Czechoslovak actor Jiří Vršťala, who was mainly known as children's star Clown Ferdinand, was given the role of chief villain Red Fox. The young Henry Hübchen depicted a Lakota man in one of his earliest appearances on screen. Tokei-ihto's sister Uinonah was depicted by New York-born Kati Székely, whose father, Hungarian screenwriter János 'Hans' Székelywho won the Academy Award for Best Story in 1940 for co-writing the script of Arise, My Love  left the United States during the McCarthy era.
A central feature of the production was the striving for authenticity and the resolve to reverse the genre conventions by stressing the Native American perspective: The film "shifted the focus to natives solely as victims and Americans as perpetrators". Theodore C. Van Alst, who studied the depiction of Native Americans in European film, noted that as it was made "many miles from the Great Plains... Many years after the events" The Sons of Great Bear "was bound to contain some inaccuracies, but they aren't from a lack of effort". However, while carefully recreating the lives of the Lakota, there are several mistakes in regards to the other side: for example, Major Samuel Smith clearly wears the rank of a colonel; a regimental flag in his headquarters carries the inscription "United States of Amerika", and a map shows the U.S.-Mexican Border as it was before the Treaty of Guadalupe Hidalgo, with Mexico stretching all the way to Oregon. Henrich, who served as the producers' adviser, was "fanatic about details": when several horses refused to be mounted without a saddle and had to be fitted with one, she resigned her post, insisting that Native Americans rode bareback.  The author later demanded that her name be removed from the credits, though it remained there. She refused to allow any more of her books to be adapted for the screen after The Sons of Great Bear, insisting "too many liberties were taken".

Principal photography for The Sons of Great Bear was conducted in summer 1965, and took place in the Socialist Republic of Montenegro and in the Elbe Sandstone Mountains. It took about two and half months, and the sum expended on making the picture was "over 2 million East German Marks".

Reception

Distribution
The Sons of Great Bear turned into an instant success upon its release, owing also to two external factors: the first was its appeal to young audiences, as many East German children were already acquainted with Henrich's books; and another was the low supply of new pictures for 1966: over half of DEFA's productions intended to be released during the year  12 out of 21, most prominently Kurt Maetzig's The Rabbit Is Me and Frank Beyer's Trace of Stoneswere banned as a result of the XI Plenum of the Socialist Unity Party of Germany which took place between the 16th and 18 December 1965, in which the allegations of rising Politburo member Erich Honecker, who blamed the cinema industry for promoting values incongruous with Marxism, were widely accepted by state functionaries. Mach's film was one of those deemed innocuous enough to remain unscathed by censures.

The film quickly crossed the one million viewers threshold, "that magical number in DEFA terms" which signaled resounding commercial success, and by the end of the year attracted about five million people to cinemas, garnering 4.8 million East German Mark in revenues and turning to the highest-grossing picture of the year. In total, it sold 9,442,395 in the German Democratic Republic. It also became an export success, and was soon distributed in the Federal Republic of Germanyan uncommon achievement for a DEFA picture in the days prior to Chancellor Willy Brandt's rapprochement with the East German government. In the Czechoslovak Socialist Republic, it was seen by 1,737,900 viewers during its original run there in summer 1966. In the Soviet Union, where it was released in January the following year, it had 29.1 million admissions, making it to the top ten in the 1967 box office. It became popular throughout the Eastern Bloc. Walter Ulbricht requested a private screening "to understand why everyone was going to cinemas", and after the film ended he told the studio representative to "keep it up!" (weiter so!)

Critical response
The film critic of the East German Christian Democratic Union's newspaper Neue Zeit noted: "Most of the Indian novels, and therefore most Indian films, have cliché plots and characters, that have little to do with the reality of the struggle between the Whites and the natives in the late 19th Century. The romantic adventurism of the Wild West became a goal in itself... And reduced to a world of fiction, distanced from all historical truth." It was therefore "a notable feat for itself" when the film "released the topic from the chains of the cliché back to reality. There are also action and adventure here, but bound together with an exact portrayal of the tragic demise of a brave people." The Der Spiegel reviewer added: "under the pro-Indian direction of Josef Mach, the first Western of the German Democratic Republic is a shoot 'em up (Knall und-Fall) picture inlaid with a message: the athletic Red men shoot the Whites down from the saddle, and then stand between the tents, unemployed; the palefaces, on the contrary, drink and gamble in some fort.".

Analysis
Dartmouth College Professor Gerd Gemünden believed the film's popularity in the German Democratic Republic, and that of its sequels, could be attributed to the manner in which both the personal biography of Mitić and the characteristics of his screen personae resonated with both the audience and the establishment. First, the actor was the son of Živojin Mitić, an officer of Marshal Josip Broz Tito's Yugoslav National Liberation Army who fought the Germans in World War II, thus fitting in with the GDR' state-espoused Anti-fascism, which was central part of national identity. The Native Americans he portrayed, like Tokei-ihto, were members of an oppressed minority "refusing to be a passive victim to genocide", thus offering a "fantasy of a resistance fighter" to the audience, especially as he was seen to organize an Old West parallel of partisan warfare; the obvious capitalistic traits of the antagonists and the fact they were American comfortably embedded the picture's narrative into the Cold War discourse. Another factor was Mitić's character's ideally German behavior: with his athleticism, serenity, leadership and express anti-alcoholism  he was often seen to spill "firewater" offered to him, a characteristic shared also by Karl May's heroeshe symbolized a "particularly Teutonic form of model citizen". In addition to all this, while he already worked with Western filmmakers, he chose to emigrate to East Berlin a welcome contrast to the constant flow of local actors defecting to the Federal Republic.

David T. McNab and Ute Lischke stressed that while purporting to present an authentic depiction of Native Americans, it also delivered orthodox East German political messages: the film's ending, in which Tokei-ihto declares his people will settle on the "rich fertile land" to "raise tame buffalo, forge iron, make ploughs" champions "no 'Indian' philosophy" but sounds more like "a new way for a worker and collective farming state". The use of religion, in the form of the bear cub saved from the cave, is an "improbable narrative... The spirit world is not understood but interpreted for the propaganda of the former East. Once again, the film exploits the 'Indians'."

Legacy
The favorable reception of The Sons of Great Bear surpassed by far what DEFA directors had anticipated, and paved the way for the making of some dozen sequels from the same genre of Indianerfilme, which for the large part also starred Mitić and became the studio's best known and most successful film series. Released for virtually every summer until the 1980s, they included such pictures as Chingachgook, die große Schlange, Spur des Falken, Weiße Wölfe, Tödlicher Irrtum, Osceola, Tecumseh, Ulzana, Blutsbrüder, Severino and Der Scout. They also featured the basic theme of The Sons of Great Bear, setting the just Native Americans against the corrupt U.S. government and settlers. Mitić's films gained cult following in East Germany, and also in the Soviet Union and the Eastern Bloc in general. They still enjoy a certain popularity in the New states of Germany, and a new wave of interest in them was rekindled with the resurgence of East German cultural nostalgia.

References

Bibliography

External links

German-language trailer at icestorm.de.
Czech-language trailer at the Czech Film Database.  
The Sons of Great Bear at progress-film.de.

1966 films
Ostern films
East German films
1960s German-language films
German Western (genre) films
Films about Native Americans
Films set in the 1870s
Films set in South Dakota
Films set in the Canadian Prairies
Films based on German novels
1966 Western (genre) films
German films about revenge
1960s German films
Foreign films set in the United States